Brodie Merrill (born November 5, 1981) is a Canadian professional lacrosse player. He currently plays in the National Lacrosse League for the San Diego Seals and Premier Lacrosse League for the Cannons. Merrill is recognized by the Premier Lacrosse League as having revolutionized the LSM position, and is the namesake for the Brodie Merrill LSM of the Year Award, being the only active PLL player to have an award named after them.

High school career
Merrill attended the Salisbury School in Connecticut. While attending Salisbury, he was a standout lacrosse player, and was named the New England Defensive Player of the Year, was selected to the All-New England team, and was selected as a First Team High School All-American.

College career
Merrill attended Georgetown University from 2002 to 2005. During his final two years, he was a First-team All-American, and won the Schmeisser Award in his senior year for defensive player of the year. During his final two seasons, Merrill was a Tewaaraton Award finalist, first team All-American and All-ECAC player, and won the William Corcoran Memorial Trophy for team MVP. Additionally, he was the ECAC Defensive Player of the Year in 2005 and finished his collegiate career with 250 ground balls, a Georgetown record for non-faceoff specialists.

Professional career

NLL career

Merrill was the first player taken overall in the 2005 National Lacrosse League Draft by the Portland LumberJax, and in 2006 was named both the NLL's Rookie of the Year and Defensive Player of the Year. During the 2009 NLL season, he was named a starter to the All-Star Game.

When the LumberJax left Portland at the end of the 2009 season, the league held a dispersal draft. Merrill was selected with the first overall pick in the draft by the Edmonton Rush.

On August 9, 2011, he was traded to the Philadelphia Wings, along with Rush forwards Dean Hill, Mike McLellan, and Edmonton's 41st selection in the 2011 entry draft, and the 4th round selection in 2013. In return, Philadelphia sent Athan Iannucci with teammates Alex Turner and Brodie McDonald, along with Philadelphia's first round draft picks in 2012, 2013 and 2014.

On November 29, 2018, Brodie was signed by the San Diego Seals where he was named captain.

On February 22, 2020, Merrill became the NLL's all time loose ball leader.

MLL career
Merrill was  the MLL Rookie of the Year in 2005 as a member of the Baltimore Bayhawks. From 2006 to 2007, he played for the Rochester Rattlers. For four consecutive years he was awarded the Major League Lacrosse Defensive Player of the Year Awards. He then helped the Toronto Nationals win their first MLL championship in their inaugural season, and won the defensive player of the year award for a record fourth consecutive year.  Merrill is the all-time ground ball leader in the MLL.

PLL career
In 2019, Merrill joined Paul Rabil’s new Premier Lacrosse League as a member of the Chaos Lacrosse Club.

On March 11, 2021, Merrill was selected first overall by Cannons Lacrosse Club, the reincarnation of the Boston Cannons, in the PLL Expansion Draft.

Merrill played in his 200th professional field lacrosse game on August 21, 2021, the most of any player in history.

Canadian Box career

Junior
Merrill played his junior lacrosse with the Orangeville Northmen of the OLA Junior A Lacrosse League. In 2000, Merrill lead the Northmen to a league championship. In 2001, Merrill was awarded the "John McCauley Award" for Best Defensive Player, and shared the "B.W. Evans Award" for Top Graduating Player with Dan Bowman the following year.

Senior
Merrill began his senior career with the Coquitlam Adanacs of the Western Lacrosse Association, and later the Brampton Excelsiors of Major Series Lacrosse, winning two consecutive Mann Cup championships (2008–2009). Merrill is currently playing for the Kahnawake Mohawks in the Quebec Senior Lacrosse League.

International career
In 2006, he helped the Canadian national lacrosse team to an historic win at the World Lacrosse Championship in London, Ontario. He had an outstanding tournament, being named Best Defender and earning All-World honours.

Personal
Brodie and his brother Patrick were a member of the Toronto Rock. Both Brodie and Patrick are members of the Brampton Excelsiors in the Major Series Lacrosse and both were members the Hamilton Nationals of Major League Lacrosse. Additionally, Patrick currently coaches Brodie with the San Diego Seals. He was named by Inside Lacrosse as "The Best Player in the World."-Inside Lacrosse. He is also the Dean of Students and head men's lacrosse coach at The Hill Academy in Caledon, Ontario. At a very young age, he was best friends with lacrosse player Kyle Miller. Both loved the game and chose to play together at the Salisbury School, a prep school in Connecticut, but went on to different colleges. Kyle and Brodie were reunited as teammates on the Canadian roster for the 2006 World Lacrosse Championships. Kyle was diagnosed in 2011 as having Osteosarcoma. He died on June 8, 2013. Brodie is the main editor for the online lacrosse magazine, Brodie Merrill Lacrosse.

Statistics

NLL
Reference:

Premier Lacrosse League

Major League Lacrosse

Canadian Lacrosse Association

Awards

References

1981 births
Canadian expatriates in the United States
Canadian lacrosse players
Edmonton Rush players
Georgetown Hoyas men's lacrosse players
Lacrosse people from Ontario
Lacrosse transitions
Living people
Major League Lacrosse major award winners
Major League Lacrosse players
National Lacrosse League All-Stars
National Lacrosse League major award winners
People from Orangeville, Ontario
Portland LumberJax players
Hamilton Nationals players
Premier Lacrosse League players
San Diego Seals players
Toronto Rock players
Rochester Rattlers players
Chesapeake Bayhawks players